James Lee Massey (February 11, 1934 – June 16, 2013) was an American information theorist and
cryptographer, Professor Emeritus of Digital Technology at ETH Zurich. His notable work includes the application of the Berlekamp–Massey algorithm to linear codes, the design of the block ciphers IDEA (with Xuejia Lai, based on the Lai-Massey scheme) and SAFER, and the Massey-Omura cryptosystem (with Jim K. Omura).

Biography
Massey was born in Wauseon, Ohio. As a child, after the death of his father in Ohio, he moved with his mother and brother to Mendota, Illinois. At age 14, his family moved to Ottawa, Illinois. After graduating from St. Bede Academy, he entered the University of Notre Dame. He received a B.S. in electrical engineering from Notre Dame in 1956 and was granted an NSF Fellowship. After three years of military service, he began graduate studies in 1959 at MIT, where he concentrated on coding theory and was awarded a Ph.D. in 1962, with John Wozencraft as his advisor. He returned to Notre Dame, where he taught electrical engineering until 1977, publishing significant research in convolutional codes, frame synchronization techniques and feedback-assisted communication. After a brief period at UCLA, Massey accepted a position at ETH Zurich in 1980. He remained there until his retirement in 1998.

Massey died of colon cancer on June 16, 2013 in Copenhagen, Denmark.

Honors and awards
IEEE Fellow, 1971
Baker Prize, 1987
Claude E. Shannon Award, 1988
IEEE Alexander Graham Bell Medal, 1992
Marconi Prize, 1999
Member of the National Academy of Engineering
Member of the Royal Swedish Academy of Sciences
IACR Fellow, 2009

References

External links
James Massey's CV at ETH Zurich
 James Massey's bio at IEEE Global History Network
 

1934 births
American twins
American information theorists
American cryptographers
Modern cryptographers
American electrical engineers
Academic staff of ETH Zurich
University of Notre Dame alumni
Massachusetts Institute of Technology alumni
Fellow Members of the IEEE
Members of the United States National Academy of Engineering
Members of the Royal Swedish Academy of Sciences
Members of the European Academy of Sciences and Arts
2013 deaths
Deaths from cancer in Denmark
Deaths from colorectal cancer
People from Wauseon, Ohio
International Association for Cryptologic Research fellows
Engineers from Ohio